SRF zwei (Swiss Radio and Television Two) is a Swiss German-language free-to-air television channel run under the public SRG SSR broadcasting group.

History 
The channel was launched in 1997 as 'SF 2' as the German-speaking replacement for the formerly nationwide second public channel S Plus (which originally launched in 1993 and was subsequently renamed 'Schweiz 4' (de) in 1995). It is the second of the three national German-language channels in Switzerland (the others being SRF 1 and SRF info).

SF 2 was renamed to 'SF zwei' on 5 December 2005, in order to differentiate it more from its sister channel SF 1. An HD version launched on 29 February 2012.

Programming
SRF zwei mainly broadcasts programmes aimed towards a younger audience. There is a heavy emphasis on movies, TV series and sporting events, much like its Austrian equivalent ORF 1. Feature films and TV series are often broadcast with both the German dub and the original soundtrack.

From 1998 to 2003, a Nickelodeon-branded programming block was broadcast on SRF zwei (then known as SF 2) on weekdays between 10am and 5pm; there was a mixture of Nicktoons and Swiss productions, as well as live broadcasts featuring interactive games. In addition, a Junior-branded block was broadcast on weekend mornings; this was extended to weekdays from September 2003, replacing the Nickelodeon block. This too ended in December 2006, and was replaced by SF tubii, which was renamed Zambo in 2010.

On 29 February 2012, a major programme overhaul was undertaken: the children's block Zambo was shortened and moved to SRF 1, due to programming on SRF zwei regularly being interrupted for sports broadcasts. In addition, The Simpsons was removed from its early evening slot due to poor ratings, and was replaced with a series of in-house productions.

Broadcasts
 sport live: Live sporting events
 sport aktuell: Daily sports news magazine
 sportpanorama: Weekly in-depth sports magazine 
 PresseTV: Various magazine programmes produced by print magazines
 Movies
 TV series

Entertainment 

Eurovision Choir
Eurovision Song Contest
Eurovision Young Musicians
Junior Eurovision Song Contest

Series 

Babylon Berlin (2018–present)
Chicago Justice (2018–present)
Chicago P.D. (2015–present)
Code Black (2016)
Crazy Ex-Girlfriend (2017)
Der Lehrer (2010-2011)
Desperate Housewives (2005-201?)
Devious Maids (Devious Maids - Schmutzige Geheimnisse) (2014, 2017)
Fringe (Fringe - Grenzfälle des FBI) (2009-2011, 2014)
Glee (2011-201?)
Grey's Anatomy (2006–present)
Intelligence (2015–present)
Last Man Standing (2014–present)
Line of Duty (2017–present)
Mad Men (2018–present)
Madam Secretary (2015–present)
Prime Suspect (Heißer Verdacht) (2006)
Prison Break (2007-201?)
Revenge (2012-2016, 2018–present)
Station 19 (Seattle Firefighters - Die jungen Helden) (2018–present)
Stalker (2015-2017)
Tatort (2011–present)
The Catch (2017–present)
The Fall (The Fall – Tod in Belfast) (2018–present)
The Great Indoors (2018–present)
The Grinder (2016-2017)
The Guardian (The Guardian - Retter mit Herz) (2005, 2012-2016, 2018–present)

Sport 

Credit Suisse Super League
Schweizer Cup
Swiss Internationals
FIFA World Cup
UEFA Euro
UEFA Nations League (Switzerland matches only)
UEFA Champions League
UEFA Europa League
UEFA Super Cup
Davis Cup (Switzerland matches only)
Fed Cup (Switzerland matches only)

Logos and identities

References

External links
 Official website

Television stations in Switzerland
Television channels and stations established in 1997
German-language television in Switzerland